Reiner Trik (born 2 June 1963) is a German wrestler. He competed at the 1984 Summer Olympics and the 1988 Summer Olympics.

References

External links
 

1963 births
Living people
German male sport wrestlers
Olympic wrestlers of West Germany
Wrestlers at the 1984 Summer Olympics
Wrestlers at the 1988 Summer Olympics
People from Rottweil (district)
Sportspeople from Freiburg (region)